Mlyniv Raion was a raion in Rivne Oblast in western Ukraine. Its administrative center was the urban-type settlement of Mlyniv. The raion was abolished and its territory was merged into Dubno Raion on 18 July 2020 as part of the administrative reform of Ukraine, which reduced the number of raions of Rivne Oblast to four. The last estimate of the raion population was

See also
 Subdivisions of Ukraine

References

External links
 rv.gov.ua 
 Mlyniv Raion, Rivne Oblast (Млинівський район, Ровенська область). The History of Cities and Villages of the Ukrainian SSR.

Former raions of Rivne Oblast
1940 establishments in Ukraine
Ukrainian raions abolished during the 2020 administrative reform